The men's 200 metre freestyle was a sprint swimming event in the Swimming at the 1900 Summer Olympics program in Paris. It was the shortest of the three freestyle events. It was held on 11 August and 12 August 1900. 26 swimmers from 10 nations competed. The event was won by Frederick Lane of Australia, with Zoltán Halmay of Hungary earning silver and Karl Ruberl of Austria earning bronze.

Background

This was the first appearance of the 200 metre freestyle event. It would be contested a second time, though at 220 yards, in 1904. After that, the event did not return until 1968; since then, it has been on the programme at every Summer Games.

The two favourites for this race were Frederick Lane of Australia (who had won the British championships in the 220 yards in 1899, along with various other sprint titles in Great Britain, Australia, and New Zealand) and Rob Derbyshire of Great Britain (the British champion in 1898). The two men tied for the British title in 1900. But Derbyshire came down with a stomach virus and did not compete at the 1900 Games. Without him, Lane was heavily favoured. Zoltán Halmay of Hungary was likely the nearest contender.

Competition format

The competition used a two-round format, with semifinals and a final. The entrants were divided into five semifinals; each semifinal had approximately 12 swimmers entered, though withdrawals left each with between 4 and 6 swimmers. The fastest swimmer in each semifinal advanced to the final along with the next five fastest times overall. This resulted in a 10-swimmer final.

The races were swum downstream in the Seine. This swimming event used freestyle swimming, which means that the method of the stroke is not regulated (unlike backstroke, breaststroke, and butterfly events).

Records

There were no recognized records in the 200 metre freestyle before this competition. World records would not be recognized until 1902. Otto Wahle had the best time in the first semifinal at 2:35.6, setting the initial Olympic record. Karl Ruberl's fifth semifinal time was 2:22.6, which would stand as the record after these Games when the final times were all slower.

Schedule

Results

Semifinals

In the first round, there were five semifinals. The winner of each semifinal advanced to the final, as did the five fastest losers from across all the semifinals. The semifinals were held on 11 August.

Semifinal 1

Semifinal 2

Semifinal 3

Semifinal 4

Semifinal 5

Final

The final was held on 12 August. Wahle did not start in the final. Lane won easily, more than six seconds ahead of Halmay and Ruberl.

Results summary

References

Swimming at the 1900 Summer Olympics
200 metre freestyle at the Olympics